Thiamine transporter 2 (ThTr-2), also known as solute carrier family 19 member 3, is a protein that in humans is encoded by the SLC19A3 gene. SLC19A3 is a thiamine transporter.

Function 

ThTr-2 is a ubiquitously expressed transmembrane thiamine transporter that lacks folate transport activity.

It is specifically inhibited by chloroquine.

Clinical significance 

Mutations in this gene cause biotin-responsive basal ganglia disease (BBGD); a recessive disorder manifested in childhood that progresses to chronic encephalopathy, dystonia, quadriparesis, and death if untreated. Patients with BBGD have bilateral necrosis in the head of the caudate nucleus and in the putamen. Administration of high doses of biotin in the early progression of the disorder eliminates pathological symptoms while delayed treatment results in residual paraparesis, mild mental retardation, or dystonia. Administration of thiamine is ineffective in the treatment of this disorder. Experiments have failed to show that this protein can transport biotin. Mutations in this gene also cause a Wernicke's-like encephalopathy.

References

Further reading

External links
 

Solute carrier family